The 2014 PRAFL season will be the 1st season of the semi-pro Puerto Rican American football league. Officially, it is the 1st season of the league. Cataño is scheduled to host the 1st Championship on June 8. The regular season will begin March 9 and end on May 25.

Standings

Note: GP = Games Played, W = Wins, L = Losses, T = Ties, PF = Points For, PA = Points Against, Pts = Points, F/R = Final Record Including Playoffs

''Teams in bold are in playoff positions.X – clinched playoff berth and plays first round. Y – clinched first/second place and first round bye to semi-finals

PRAFL playoffs

Playoff bracket

*-Team won in Overtime.

References

Puerto Rico American Football League seasons